Fjord of the Mountains, also known as "Channel of the Mountains" (Spanish Canal de las Montañas), is located to the west of Puerto Natales, Chile and  inside the boundaries of the Alacalufes National Reserve. It stretches 66 km from north to south and is flanked by two mountain ranges, the Cordillera Sarmiento to the west and the Cordillera Riesco to the east.

See also
 Seno Ultima Esperanza

References
Canal de las Montañas

Fjords of Chile
Bodies of water of Magallanes Region
Última Esperanza Province